Howie Pyro (born Howard Kusten, June 28, 1960 – May 4, 2022) was an American bass player. He was a founding member of The Blessed, Freaks, D Generation, and PCP Highway. Pyro was also the bass player in Danzig from 2000–2003.

Biography
Pyro was a DJ at Green Door parties. He was the host of Intoxica Radio with Howie Pyro, an internet radio show where he played "50s and 60s rock and roll, psycho surf, garage, rockabilly, hillbilly horrors, voodoo r & b, insane instrumentals, religious nuts, and teenage hell music." Pyro was also friends with Sid Vicious and was one of the last people to see the former Sex Pistols bassist alive; Pyro was there the night he died from a heroin overdose.

In December 2021, it was announced that Pyro was fighting for his life and in recovery following a liver transplant. His longtime friend and D Generation bandmate Jesse Malin announced a benefit concert for Pyro in January 2022, with all funds raised going to Pyro's medical and living expense for the next year as he recovered. Various other benefit shows were held for Pyro as well.

He died on May 4, 2022, from COVID-19-related pneumonia after suffering from liver disease.

Discography

With The Blessed
 "Deep Frenzy" / "American Bandstand" (1979)

With Freaks
 Pippi Skelter: A Rock Opera in Five Movements (1988)
 Potter's Field - EP - (1988)
 In Sensurround (1989)
"Freakout Song" - Single - (1990)

With Action Swingers
 More Fast Numbers (1992)

With D Generation
"No Way Out" - Single - (1993)
Re-released in 1994 and 1996.
"Wasted Years" - Single - (1993)
"No God" / "Degenerated" - Single - (1994)
D Generation - (1994)
No Lunch - (1996)
"She Stands There" - Single - (1996)
"Capital Offender" - Single - (1997)
"Prohibition" - EP - (1998)
"Helpless" - Single - (1998)
Re-released in 1999.
Through The Darkness - (1999)
Nothing Is Anywhere - (2016)

With Joey Ramone
Christmas Spirit... In My House (2002)

With Genesis P. Orridge / Splinter Test
Electric Newspaper: Issue Four (1997)

With Danzig
Live on the Black Hand Side - (2001)
I Luciferi - (2002)

References

External links
 

1964 births
2022 deaths
Danzig (band) members
American people of Jewish descent
American people of Puerto Rican descent
Musicians from New York (state)
People from Queens, New York
Deaths from the COVID-19 pandemic in California